Devra Bada Satawela is a 2010 Indian Bhojpuri language film directed by Rajkumar R. Pandey. The main stars are Ravi Kishan, Pradeep Pandey Pakhi Hegde, Monalisha in this film.

Cast
Pradeep Pandey as Chintu
Ravi Kishan as Ravi
Rani Chatterjee as Rani
Monalisha as Mona
Pawan Singh as Pawan
Awadhesh Mishra as Sunny

References

External links
 

2010 films
Indian action films
2010s Hindi-language films
Films directed by Rajkumar R. Pandey
2010s Bhojpuri-language films
2010 action films
2010 multilingual films
Indian multilingual films